The 2009 Queensland Cup season was the 14th season of Queensland's top-level statewide rugby league competition run by the Queensland Rugby League. The competition, known as the Queensland Wizard Cup due to sponsorship from Wizard Home Loans featured 12 teams playing a 25-week-long season (including finals) from March to September.

The Sunshine Coast Sea Eagles, in their first season back in the competition, won their first premiership after defeating the Northern Pride 32–18 at Stockland Park. Burleigh Bears'  Scott Smith was named the competition's Player of the Year, winning the Courier Mail Medal.

Teams 
In 2009, the Queensland Cup featured 12 teams for the first time since the 2004 season. The Sunshine Coast Falcons, re-branded as the Sunshine Coast Sea Eagles, returned to the competition after the Manly Warringah Sea Eagles injected $1 million into the club and formed a partnership.

Ladder

Final series 
In 2009, after using a five-team finals series for 10 years, the Queensland Cup used a six-team system. The competition used a six-team format from 1996 to 1998, although the system used in 2009 was two weeks shorter.

Grand Final 

The Northern Pride, who finished the regular season in second, qualified for their first Grand Final after a 22–10 win over the Central Comets in the preliminary final. They were joined by the Sunshine Coast, who finished fourth in their return season, after they defeated reigning premiers Souths Logan 30–26 in the preliminary final.

First half 
The Pride opened the scoring in the fifth minute when they created a huge overlap, with centre Jamie Frizzo finishing off the play with a try. The Sunshine Coast responded quickly when five-eighth Tony Williams bumped off a defender and threw an offload to centre Shane Neumann who crossed for his first try. The Sea Eagles hit the lead in the 27th minute when winger Michael Chapman scored untouched in the corner. They scored again four minutes later when Ryan Walker scored in the opposite corner. Poor goal kicking kept the Pride in the contest, as Williams missed all three conversion attempts. The Pride converted a penalty from right in front on the stroke of half time to trail by just eight at the break.

Second half 
The Sunshine Coast extended the lead to 10 in the 47th minute when Williams dived over for a try of his own. The Sea Eagles kept the points coming when Neumann dived over in the corner for his second just six minutes later. With just over 10 minutes remaining, the Pride gave themselves a chance when Rod Jensen scored and cut the Sea Eagles' lead to 10. Three minutes later, the Sunshine Coast all but sealed victory when halfback Trent Hodkinson scored close to the posts. The Pride scored a late consolation try when Humble latched onto a wayward Sea Eagles' pass and ran 80 metres to score under the uprights. In the final minute, Neumann crossed for his hat trick as the Sea Eagles' wrapped up a 14-point victory.

Tony Williams, who was awarded the Duncan Hall Medal, and second rower Vic Mauro would go onto play in the Manly Sea Eagles' 2011 NRL Grand Final win over the New Zealand Warriors.

End-of-season awards 
 Courier Mail Medal (Best and Fairest): Scott Smith ( Burleigh Bears)
 QANTAS Player of the Year (Coaches Award): Ian Lacey ( Ipswich Jets)
 Coach of the Year: Paul Bramley ( Souths Logan Magpies)
 Rookie of the Year: Matt Gillett ( Norths Devils)
 Representative Player of the Year: Scott Smith ( Queensland Residents,  Burleigh Bears)

See also 

 Queensland Cup
 Queensland Rugby League

References 

2009 in Australian rugby league
Queensland Cup